Dustin Lind is an American professional baseball director of hitting and assistant hitting coach for the San Francisco Giants of Major League Baseball (MLB).  He played college baseball for Montana State University-Billings, and also attended Idaho State University.

Early life and education
Lind's hometown is Florence, Montana.  He attended Florence-Carlton High School in Florence, Montana, graduating in 2007.

Lind attended Montana State University-Billings where he played college baseball as an outfielder, before injuries ended his playing career there. He then transferred to Idaho State University, where he played club baseball. He graduated from ISU in 2014 with a degree in exercise science. Lind earned his doctorate in physical therapy from the University of Montana in 2017. In 2019 he received the ISU Young Alumni Award.

Coaching career
From 2014–17, Lind worked as an independent hitting consultant working with MLB and minor league players. He also worked as an outpatient orthopedic physical therapist in Montana.

Lind was hired by the Seattle Mariners and served as a minor league quality assurance coach in 2018. In 2019, he worked as the Mariners director of hitting development and strategies on the major league coaching staff, working with hitters, hitting coaches, and analysts to optimize hitting development and performance.

On December 11, 2019, Lind was hired by the San Francisco Giants as their director of hitting and assistant hitting coach.

References

External links
Montana State Billings Yellowjackets bio
"Dustin Lind Interview," January 9, 2018

Year of birth missing (living people)
Living people
People from Ravalli County, Montana
Baseball coaches from Montana
Major League Baseball hitting coaches
San Francisco Giants coaches
Montana State Billings Yellowjackets baseball players
Minor league baseball coaches
Idaho State University alumni
University of Montana alumni